The Mianjangal protected area is a protected area located near the town of Sarvestan in the south of Iran.

See also

List of national parks and protected areas of Iran

References

Protected areas of Iran